The women's middleweight competition in powerlifting at the 2009 World Games took place on 25 July 2009 at the National Sun Yat-sen University, Sun Yat-San Hall in Kaohsiung, Taiwan.

Competition format
A total of 10 athletes entered the competition. Each athlete had 3 attempts in each of 3 events: squat, bench press and deadlift. The athlete with the biggest score in Wilks points is the winner.

Results

References

External links
 Results on IWGA website

Powerlifting at the 2009 World Games